Watchtower Hill is a small, pointed hill at the southeast side of Pinnacle Gap in the Mesa Range, in Victoria Land. So named by the northern party of New Zealand Geological Survey Antarctic Expedition (NZGSAE), 1962–63, because the feature provides a good "watchtower" to the entrance of Pinnacle Gap.

Hills of Victoria Land
Pennell Coast